The Man with the Limp (German:Das Geheimnis von Genf) is a 1928 German silent film directed by Willy Reiber and Franz Seitz and starring Christa Tordy, Alfred Abel and Carmen Cartellieri.

The film's art direction was by Ludwig Reiber. It was made at the Emelka Studios in Munich.

Cast
 Christa Tordy as Betty Marshall, amerikanische Journalistin
 Alfred Abel as Baron Enderny, ein Journalist / Varenne, der Lahme
 Carmen Cartellieri as Madame Pique
 Eric Barclay as René
 Bert Bloem as John Lavington, Sekretär des Völkerbunds
 Luigi Serventi as McHenning, Völkerbund-Delegierter
 Ernst Reicher as Mons. Durand - Chef der Genfer Polizei
 Georg Henrich as Graf Firbach, Minister von Nordland
 Rolf Pinegger as Herr von Wächter, sein Sekretär
 Olly Orska
 Max Weydner
 Wilhelm Stauffen
 Julius Riedmueller
 August Weigert

References

Bibliography
 Bock, Hans-Michael & Bergfelder, Tim. The Concise CineGraph. Encyclopedia of German Cinema. Berghahn Books, 2009.

External links

1928 films
Films of the Weimar Republic
Films directed by Franz Seitz
Films directed by Willy Reiber
German silent feature films
Films set in Switzerland
Bavaria Film films
German black-and-white films
Films shot at Bavaria Studios